Longridge is a civil parish in Ribble Valley, Lancashire, England.  It contains 15 listed buildings that are recorded in the National Heritage List for England.  Of these, one is at Grade II*, the middle grade, and the others are at Grade II, the lowest grade.  The parish contains the town of Longridge and surrounding countryside.  Most of the listed buildings are houses and farmhouses.  The others include three churches, an inscribed stone, a tunnel portal, and a war memorial.

Key

Buildings

References

Citations

Sources

Lists of listed buildings in Lancashire
Buildings and structures in Ribble Valley
Listed buildings in